Flórián Albert (15 September 1941 – 31 October 2011) was a Hungarian professional football player, manager and sports official, who was named European Footballer of the Year in 1967. Nicknamed "The Emperor", he played as a forward, and has been described as one of the most elegant footballers of all time.

A club legend of Ferencvárosi TC, Albert joined the team as a schoolboy and spent his whole playing career at Fradi. He also starred for Hungary, winning 75 international caps and scoring 31 goals. He was joint top-scorer at the 1962 World Cup with four goals and played a key role in Hungary's third-place finish at the European Championship in 1964.

He stayed loyal to Ferencváros after his retirement as well, actively participated in the club's life and also held administrative positions. Since 2007 the stadium of Ferencváros bears his name.

Albert died in October 2011, aged 70, in a hospital in Budapest after complications following heart surgery carried out a few days earlier.

Early life
The son of a blacksmith, Albert was born and brought up in the little town of Hercegszántó near the border with the former Yugoslavia, where he got his first taste of the game playing with his two brothers. His mother was Hungarian Croat, from the group of Šokci. She died when he was two. When the family later moved to Budapest, Albert participated on a talent day held by Ferencváros. He impressed the coaches and was selected by the club. Albert was 11 years old at the time.

Career
Albert spent his entire club career with Ferencvárosi TC, where he played from 1952 to 1974. He came through the ranks quickly and made his debut in the senior team on 2 November 1958 against Diósgyőr, in a match in which he hit the back of the net two times. The forward was also spotted by Hungarian national team manager Lajos Baróti in a youth match between Hungary and Yugoslavia, and not much later Albert already received his first call-up. His first appearance in the national selection came on 28 June 1959 against Sweden, who finished runners-up in the World Cup a year earlier. Albert contributed with two assist to Hungary's 3–2 win over the Scandinavians. He scored 31 goals in 75 caps for the Hungarian team, with them he has collected the bronze medal on both of the Olympic Games in 1960 and the European Championship in 1964. At the 1962 World Cup, despite Hungary being knocked out in the quarter-finals, Albert, tied with five others, managed to win the Golden Boot Award with four goals.

On club level, his biggest success came in 1965, when in the Inter-Cities Fairs Cup, Ferencváros, that knocked-out among others AS Roma and Manchester United F.C. en route to the final, triumphed over Juventus F.C. 1–0 in the decisive match and obtained the cup title.

Albert appeared in his next World event in 1966 in England, where he produced an excellent display against Brazil in a duel that is regarded as one of the greatest matches in the history of the World Cup. The Magyars, after losing to Portugal in their first round encounter, entered a must-win match against Brazil. Hungary eventually beat the South Americans 3–1, to keep alive their hopes, and Albert, who received a standing ovation from the supporters, made the fans forget the absence of Pelé with his performance. By winning their final group match, Hungary made it to the quarter-finals, just to fall short against the Soviet Union.

The year 1967 was a special one for Albert, who not only won the Hungarian Championship with Ferencváros and collected the Hungarian Player of the Year title, but in December first celebrated the birth of his son, and later he was awarded the Ballon d'Or in recognition of his outstanding attributes. Albert topped the voting with 68 points, twenty-eight ahead of Bobby Charlton, who came second.

In 1968 Albert appeared in the Inter-Cities Fairs Cup final again, this time against Leeds United, but lost by a one-goal margin (0–1). On 15 June 1969, in a World Cup qualifier against Denmark, Albert collided with Knud Engedal, goalkeeper of the Scandinavians, and suffered a serious fractured leg injury. Following that he was sidelined for almost a year and could never win back his form any more. Albert returned into action in the Hungarian Championship on 27 April 1970 against Salgótarján and on 4 April 1971 he played his first international match after the injury, a friendly match against Austria. His final major event was the 1972 European Championship, where he captured fourth place with Hungary, recording two appearances in the tournament. In the same year he captured the Hungarian Cup title for the first time, thus making his collection of domestic silverware complete.

Albert played his final league match on 17 March 1974 against Zalaegerszeg. He came on as a substitute in the second half and contributed to the 3–0 victory with a goal, the last one in his career. Albert, after receiving greetings and gifts from the old boys, the opponents and his son, ran to the stands, bowed for the fans and left the field on the shoulders of his teammates.

Following his retirement, he had two short spells as a manager in Libya with Al-Ahly Benghazi, however, with only limited success. After returning from North Africa, Albert worked for Ferencváros in several positions, such as technical director, department leader and later honorary chairman. In 2007, Ferencváros' stadium was named after him. In the same year, he received a prize in his village of birth, Hercegszántó, becoming an honorable citizen. In 2010 Budapest, a year later, Ferencváros awarded him honorary citizenship.

Personal life
Albert married Irén Bársony, an actress, on 30 November 1963. The couple had two children, a girl, Magdolna, and a son, Flórián Albert Jr., who, like his father, became a football player with Ferencváros, and later had spells in Israel and France and also played for the Hungarian national team. Albert's grandchild, Flórián Patrik, aims to become a professional footballer as well.

Death

On 27 October 2011, Flórián, after suffering a vasoconstriction, underwent coronary artery bypass surgery. Although a press release the following day by his former club Ferencváros stated that the operation had been successful, he subsequently suffered a heart attack and died in the early hours of 31 October 2011.

His funeral took place on 6 November 2011 in the Cemetery of Óbuda. Hundreds of mourners accompanied Albert to his final rest, including Viktor Orbán, Prime Minister of Hungary; Pál Schmitt, President of Hungary; Sándor Csányi, president of the Hungarian Football Federation; Gábor Kubatov, president of Ferencvárosi TC; and former teammates Kálmán Mészöly, Gyula Rákosi, Lajos Szűcs and Tibor Nyilasi. The event was also live broadcast by Hungarian public television Magyar Televízió.

In the afternoon same day, Ferencváros played a league clash against Paksi SE. Before the match the floodlights were switched off and the stadium turned into dark, with candles lit by the fans are being the only lights in the arena. Ferencváros players wore a special all-black kit in the occasion and fans paid tribute to Albert with a banner saying "God shall be with you Emperor". Supporters of SK Rapid Wien, who have close ties with Ferencváros, also shown honor to Albert with a transparent in their game against SV Ried.

The friendly match against Liechtenstein played on 11 November was declared a memorial game for Albert by the Hungarian Football Federation. The clash was originally scheduled to take place at the Sóstói Stadion, but later was moved to the Ferenc Puskás Stadium to give more people the opportunity to attend the event. In the four corners of the arena memorial places were erected, where the supporters could pay their tribute to the Golden Ball winner. A five-minute-long compilation of the best moments of Albert was also projected before the kick-off.

Hungary eventually won the match 5–0 in front of a sold-out crowd with two goals by Balázs Dzsudzsák, and further strikes from Tamás Priskin, Vladimir Koman and Róbert Feczesin. Dzsudzsák commented after the match that he is sure that Flórián would have been happy if he could have seen the match, and added that he hopes they rejoiced him in Heaven.

Career statistics

Club

International

Honours 
Ferencváros
 Inter-Cities Fairs Cup: 1964–65
 Hungarian League 1963, 1964, 1967 and 1968
 Hungarian Cup 1972

Individual
 Ballon d'Or: 1967
 Best Young Player Award: FIFA World Cup 1962
 Top Scorer (Golden Boot): FIFA World Cup 1962 (shared with five other players at 4 goals)
 All-Star Team: FIFA World Cup 1966
UEFA European Championship Team of the Tournament: 1964
 Top Scorer: European Cup 1966
 Top Scorer: Inter-Cities Fairs Cup 1967
 Top Scorer: Hungarian Championship 1960, 1961, 1965
 Hungarian Footballer of the Year 1966, 1967
 Officier's Cross of Order of Merit of the Republic of Hungary 1994
 Middle Cross of the Order Merit of the Republic of Hungary 2011
 Sportsperson of the Nation (A Nemzet Sportolója) 2004
 The stadium of Ferencvarosi TC was renamed to Albert-stadium in his honor in 2007
 Honorable Citizen of Hercegszántó 2007
 Honorable Citizen of Budapest 2010
 Honorable Citizen of Ferencváros 2011

References

External links
 
 Portrait of Flórián Albert – Thury, Gábor (2011), Nemzeti Sport Online

1941 births
2011 deaths
1962 FIFA World Cup players
1966 FIFA World Cup players
Association football forwards
Ballon d'Or winners
Expatriate football managers in Libya
Ferencvárosi TC footballers
Footballers at the 1960 Summer Olympics
Hungarian footballers
Hungarian football managers
Hungary international footballers
People from Hercegszántó
Olympic footballers of Hungary
Olympic bronze medalists for Hungary
Olympic medalists in football
1964 European Nations' Cup players
UEFA Euro 1972 players
Officer's Crosses of the Order of Merit of the Republic of Hungary (civil)
Nemzeti Bajnokság I players
Medalists at the 1960 Summer Olympics
Hungarian people of Croatian descent
Sportspeople from Bács-Kiskun County
UEFA Champions League top scorers